The Caravan Sites Act 1968 (c. 52) is an Act of the Parliament of the United Kingdom, which resulted in the provision of 400 halting sites in the UK – where there had been no council-sites before. The act was passed after a series of protests against the Caravan Sites and Control of Development Act 1960, which allowed local authorities to close traditional stops used by travellers.

The private member's bill was proposed by Eric Lubbock of the Liberal Party.

The Act was effectively repealed by the Criminal Justice and Public Order Act 1994.

References

External links

United Kingdom Acts of Parliament 1968